"Single Stamina" is the tenth episode in the second season of the television series How I Met Your Mother. It originally aired on November 27, 2006. The episode was nominated for the GLAAD Media Award for Outstanding Individual Episode.

Plot
It is winter in New York City; Marshall, Lily, Ted, and Robin are in "couples' hibernation mode". Barney tries to get them to go out, but the two couples consistently refuse. Tired of being his own wingman, Barney announces that he's invited his brother James (Wayne Brady) to town. Ted warns Robin that James is just like Barney, only gay, so she shouldn't be surprised. James arrives and Robin is very surprised to discover that James is black. Robin asks what the back-story is, and it is revealed that the two don't really know it; amongst other things, their mother says that Barney is white because she ate vanilla ice cream when she was pregnant with him, and James is black because she ate chocolate ice cream.

James tells them that they are young people living in New York and that they should go out and have fun. The six of them go out, and James helps Barney pick up a girl with a lower back tattoo. Lily, Marshall, Robin, and Ted comment on the differences between single people and people in couples. While they are discussing whether it is more difficult to pick up a girl or to deflect obnoxious guys picking you up, the group notices that James is acting strangely. He has been turning down a lot of guys tonight, complaining about his feet hurting him, and generally acting like the four of them. When they see James text messaging someone, they realize that he must be in a monogamous relationship and they have to tell Barney. Barney confronts James, grabbing James's phone, which has a picture of James and another man on it. James tells Barney that the man in the picture is Tom, his fiancé. James then asks Barney to be his best man. Barney says no, which crushes James.

The next day, Barney goes to the apartment and laments that once gay men start getting married, everyone else will get married, too (because whatever gay people do, everyone else starts doing six months later), and single life as we know it will be ruined. Marshall points out that just because James is getting married doesn't mean things have to change, and Barney points out that the four of them have changed. Ted says that his sister married someone he didn't like, but he realized he had to support it anyway, and tells Barney he should do the same with James. Barney says he will take James out to celebrate, and takes him to a gay club. At the club, gay men hit on Ted and Marshall, and the two point out that getting hit on is flattering; meanwhile, the girls are excited that they can dance without being groped. However, after several men come onto Ted and Marshall, they become uncomfortable, while the girls realize they miss the attention.

Meanwhile, Barney tries to hook James up with other men. When James resists their advances, Barney accuses James of abandoning him and their way of life. James surprises Barney when he tells him that he and Tom are adopting a baby. Barney is excited that he will be an uncle, and a year later, makes a toast at Tom and James' wedding. Marshall and Lily leave because of the time but Ted and Robin stay (hinting at the fact that they have broken up at this point, as they both have "single stamina"). Barney meets James's son, and promises to take him out on his 21st birthday and show him how to pick up women. The baby is also wearing a suit and Barney says "great suit".

References

External links
 

2006 American television episodes
American LGBT-related television episodes
How I Met Your Mother (season 2) episodes
Works about brothers